Foton-M No.2 was an unmanned Foton-M spacecraft which carried a European payload for the European Space Agency (ESA). It was placed into orbit by a Russian Soyuz-U rocket launched at 12:00 UTC on 20 June 2005 from the Baikonur Cosmodrome in Kazakhstan by the Russian Space Agency (RKA). The Foton-M No.2 mission was a replacement for the failed Foton-M No.1 mission, which was lost in a launch failure on 15 October 2002.

The  payload carried by the spacecraft included  of experiments; consisting of 39 experiments in fluid physics, biology, material science, meteoritics, radiation dosimetry and exobiology (BIOPAN-5). Some of the experiments were designed by the ESA's student programme.

One notable experiment tested the ability of lichen to survive in space. It was successful, as the lichen survived over 14 days of exposure to space.

References

External links

ESA
Russian Space Agency  in Russian
ESA: Lichen survives in Space
Soyuz space mission launched carrying 39 experiments

Satellites of Russia
Spacecraft launched in 2005
Spacecraft which reentered in 2005
Biosatellites